Cinnamon Lakeside Colombo, trading as Trans Asia Hotels PLC, is a five-star luxury hotel located in Colombo, Sri Lanka. The hotel is listed on the Colombo Stock Exchange and John Keells Holdings own a stake of 92% of the company's shares, 48% directly and 43% through its subsidiary Asian Hotels and Properties PLC. Cinnamon Lakeside Colombo has 346 rooms including 20 suites.

History
The company was incorporated in 1981 as a public limited company. The hotel commenced its operations in 1985 and was originally known as the Ramada Renaissance Hotel. In 1995 the name was changed to Trans Asia Hotel. In 2003, John Keells Holdings acquired a controlling stake of the company and in 2009, the hotel is rebranded as Cinnamon Lakeside Colombo. During the Commonwealth Heads of Government Meeting 2013, some of the heads of State stayed at the hotel with no public access during this period. In 2019, the hotel was ranked 11th of the top 25 properties in Sri Lanka in Tripadvisor's Travellers' Choice Awards.  The company is managed as a chain hotel of Cinnamon Hotels & Resorts brand and is a subsidiary of Asian Hotels and Properties PLC while John Keells Holdings is the ultimate parent company.

COVID-19 pandemic
In January 2021, Cinnamon Hotels & Resorts announced the appointment of Kamal Munasinghe as the General Manager of Cinnamon Grand Colombo and Cinnamon Lakeside Colombo. On March 7, 2021, the health authorities have given permission to resume operations during the COVID-19 pandemic, earlier a few staff members have contracted the virus while off duty. The company launched "Flavours by Cinnamon", an online food ordering platform in April 2021. The Cinnamon Hotels launched the "Meals that Heal" program, a food donation initiative with the help of the Sri Lanka Police. Under this program, the company will be distributing 2,000 food packs daily for a 14 days period to the community the company operates.

Amenities
The hotel has 346 rooms with 20 suites and eight restaurants: Royal Thai, Long Feng, the Library, ColomBar, Goodies, Pool Bar, The Lounge. The hotel also houses the largest swimming pool in Colombo, and tennis and squash courts and a gymnasium. In 2012, the hotel launched the 8° on the lake, a floating event venue on the Beira Lake. The venue could accommodate 100 guests at a time.

See also
 List of hotels in Sri Lanka

References

External links
 Official website

1981 establishments in Sri Lanka
Companies listed on the Colombo Stock Exchange
Hospitality companies of Sri Lanka
Hotels established in 1981
Hotels in Colombo